Menashe Amir (born 27 December 1939) is a long time Persian language broadcaster on Israel Radio International, a channel of Kol Yisrael (lit. "Voice of Israel").  He is a former head of the Israel Broadcasting Authority's Persian language division.  He is also a leading Iranian expert in Israel and a former chief editor of the Foreign Ministry's Persian website.

Biography 
Menashe Amir was born Manouchehr Sachmachi in Tehran, Iran, on December 27, 1939 in a secular Jewish family. He grew up in the ancient Jewish quarter called "Mahaleh". His primary education was in a Christian missionary school called "Nour-va-Sedaghat", and he continued his secondary education in two Jewish schools named "Ettehād" (Alliance/Unity) and "Kourosh" (Cyrus). He began his journalist's profession at the age of 17, at the Kayhan evening newspaper. Amir made aliyah (immigration) to Israel on October 19, 1959.

Journalism and radio career
He has been working as a journalist and a broadcaster for over 65 years, and broadcasting to Iran for over 62 years.  Amir became popular in Israel during his coverage of the 1979 Iran hostage crisis. In 2006, he founded the Persian version of the Israeli Foreign Ministry website, and served as its Chief Editor for 4 years. Currently retired from his post in the Israel Broadcasting Authority, he continues to host his radio program.

Amir hosts a daily 1.5 hour radio program in Persian, which is broadcast every evening to Iran on shortwave radio. The program includes a call-in portion, with Iranian listeners calling a special number in Germany. While no hard data is available the show is apparently popular in Iran, and some experts estimate that up to 5 million Iranians listen to it.  Beside political discussions, the program also broadcasts music banned in Iran. Iranian newspapers often denounce the radio as the "Zionist regime radio", and refute the radio program assertions.

In the aftermath of the 2009 Iranian presidential election, the Supreme Leader 
Ayatollah Ali Khamenei blamed the "Zionist radio and the bad British radio" 
for misleading the public. This was widely interpreted as a reference to Menashe Amir's program on Kol Yisrael and a reference to BBC Persian.

Published works
"Iran, Jews, Israel", a collection of interviews with Amnon Netzer, an Israeli expert in Iranian Studies, was published in Persian in 2014.

See also
Israeli journalism

References

External links 
 Interviews with Menashe Amir, on the IsraCast website
 Amir's Interviews with Amnon Netzer on Iran, Jews, Israel

Iranian emigrants to Israel
Iranian Jews
Israeli people of Iranian-Jewish descent
Israeli Mizrahi Jews
Israeli journalists
Israeli radio journalists
1940 births
Living people